Poligny is a commune in the Jura department in Bourgogne-Franche-Comté in eastern France.

The town stands at the foot of the first plateau of the Jura region, with limestone cliffs rising to its east and south, and a steephead valley leading to the village of Vaux-sur-Poligny to the east. On the cliffs to the east is a notable cave, known as "Le Trou de la Lune" (the Moonhole); on the cliffs to the south is a large cross, the "Croix du Dan".  A network of hiking trails surrounds the town and provide routes to both these viewpoints, and the GR 59 long distance footpath runs through the town.

First Empire general Jean-Pierre Travot was born in Poligny; a statue in his honour stands in the principal square of the town, the Place des Déportés, and a road is named after him.

Poligny is served by the railway line from Besançon to Lons-le-Saunier.

The town is recognised as the "Capital of Comté", with a third of the region's production of this much-loved cheese being aged in the town's cellars. The town is also surrounded by vineyards, and is home to a number of independent wine producers as well as a cooperative.

Population

Gallery

See also
Communes of the Jura department

References

External links

 

Communes of Jura (department)